Blenniella periophthalmus is a species of combtooth blenny found in coral reefs in the Pacific and Indian oceans. It is commonly known as the blue-dashed rockskipper, bullethead rockskipper, false rockskipper, or the peppered blenny. B. periophthalmus are oviparous animals and once they lay eggs, the eggs attach to the surface of the sea floor due to an adhesive coating.
B. periophthalmus prefer a depth range of 0-3 meters and can have a maximum body length of 10 centimeters.

References

External links
 

periophthalmus
Fish described in 1836